Carol (Ying) Yu (Chinese: 于盈；pinyin: Yu Ying; born January 18, 1983) is a Chinese broadcast journalist, columnist, television host and media executive. She is currently the host of “Visionaries” which airs prime time every Sunday evening on Phoenix Television and reaches over 400 million viewers in Asia alone.

Early life and education 
Carol was born in Guangzhou, Guangdong, the only child of Yu Youjun, a minister-level government official and academic, and Xu Ming, a media executive. As a child, Carol excelled at her studies, following her parents’ instruction not to focus too much on the traditional Chinese model of being the best in the class, but rather to pursue a well-rounded education and finding a way to contribute to society in a positive manner.

Carol was educated at The Affiliated High School of South China Normal University (华南师范大学附属中学), the top public high school in Guangdong Province, and completed her high school studies at San Domenico School, California’s first independent school (est. 1850) in the U.S., before enrolling in Stanford University.  After a successful internship at Morgan Stanley during her sophomore year, she graduated early with honors and joined Morgan Stanley after her junior year. After a few years of work experience, Carol returned to school and obtained a Master’s in Public Policy degree from Harvard Kennedy School.

Carol has been very active in extracurricular activities throughout her life. She held various leadership positions in student government and was very active in various performing arts throughout her elementary school, middle school and high school in China. She founded a student magazine at middle school and was the first student president of the school TV station while she was at high school in China. She has also started writing and publishing since young age. While first moved to the U.S. at junior year in high school, which was a school known for its excellence in fine arts, reading a whole book in English for the first time, Carol was cast in the leading roles of several school musicals and plays including Children of Eden and Pippen. While at Stanford, she was one of the founding members and vice-president for “Forum for American Chinese Exchange at Stanford” (FACES), vice-president for “Association of Chinese Students and Scholars at Stanford” (ACSSS), and co-founder of a political forum “Bursting the Bubble.” While at Harvard Kennedy School, she was chair of the Chinese Students Association, Co-Chair of East Asia Students Association, and Co-Chair of Asia Business Conference.

Career 
Carol began her media career at Phoenix TV as a reporter and news presenter. Later, upon deciding to rejoin Phoenix TV after obtaining a master's degree at Harvard Kennedy School, she was tasked with launching the new radio business for the group. Being head of the radio station at 28, she was the youngest head of any major media channel in Hong Kong, and was responsible for the launching and running of a new radio business in Hong Kong, as well as leading the efforts in expanding Phoenix’s multinational network in Mainland China and abroad. Carol has interviewed many top politicians, businessmen, media personalities, academics, artists, athletes, etc., and remains active as a columnist in several leading publications in China. 

Prior to joining Phoenix TV, Carol was a member of the Investment Banking Division team of Morgan Stanley Dean Witter Asia in Hong Kong. Carol has also worked at the World Bank office in Beijing and the United Nations Development Programme in New York.

Visionaries 

"Visionaries" premieres prime time every Sunday evening at 9:40pm on Phoenix Chinese Channel, and it is also broadcast on Phoenix Infonews Channel, and made simultaneously available online and on the mobile app at Phoenix New Media (iFeng.com).

"Visionaries" targets to interview global business leaders. It will not only showcase the guests' insights on current issues and future trends, but will also aim to exhibit positive values and beliefs as a way to inspire viewers to work hard to achieve their dreams, work ethically and to give back to the society, continue learning and live a meaningful life. The show will carefully select guests that are respected, not only for their business abilities, but also for their commitment to improving the world we share.

Personal 
Carol is fully trilingual, and has conducted interviews in English, Mandarin Chinese and Cantonese Chinese. She is also a regular columnist at Southern Metropolis Daily (南方都市報) (a Chinese newspaper with the largest circulation in mainland China) and Caixin Media (财新) (the most respected finance media in mainland China), and Ta Kung Pao (大公报) (the oldest active Chinese newspaper in Hong Kong). Her heart is in giving back to society and spreading good values.

References 

1983 births
Stanford University alumni
Chinese television journalists
Living people
Harvard Kennedy School alumni